Amulet is an unincorporated community in Norton Rural Municipality No. 69, Saskatchewan, Canada. It previously held village status until January 1, 1965. The community has a population of 33 people.

The townsite was formally founded in 1911 when the railway station was constructed in 1910. A post office, a general store, and two grain elevators were also built in 1910, but all were closed in 1973. A school was also built in 1910 and a second room added in 1919, but it was closed in 1961. St. Boniface Anglican Church was built in 1916, but moved to Weyburn Heritage Village in 1990.

History 
Prior to January 1, 1965, Amulet was incorporated as a village, and was restructured as an unincorporated community under the jurisdiction of the Rural municipality of Norton on that date.

Demographics

Climate

See also 
List of communities in Saskatchewan

References 

Former villages in Saskatchewan
Norton No. 69, Saskatchewan
Unincorporated communities in Saskatchewan
Division No. 2, Saskatchewan